is a Japanese stage and film actress who starred in films of directors Mikio Naruse, Yasujirō Ozu, Keisuke Kinoshita and others. She was married to film director Yoshishige Yoshida.

Biography
Okada was born the daughter of silent film actor Tokihiko Okada (real name Eiichi Takahashi), who died the year following her birth, and raised by her mother's sister in her early childhood. She gave her film debut in Mikio Naruse's 1951 Dancing Girl, for whom she worked again in Husband and Wife, Floating Clouds and Nagareru. Unsatisfied with the roles she was assigned to, she left Toho studios after her contract expired, and signed with Shochiku. In the following years, she starred in Yasujirō Ozu's Late Autumn and An Autumn Afternoon, Keisuke Kinoshita's Spring Dreams and The Scent of Incense, and Heinosuke Gosho's Hunting Rifle.

The 1962 Akitsu Springs was Okada's 100th film and the first under the direction of her future husband Yoshishige Yoshida. Between 1965 and 1971, she starred in all of Yoshida's films, independently produced melodramas narrated in an avant-garde fashion, of which Eros + Massacre was the formally most radical.

In later years, she appeared in films like Juzo Itami's Tampopo and Shinji Aoyama's My God, My God, Why Hast Thou Forsaken Me? (2005), her last film role to date. She also regularly performed on stage and on television.

Selected filmography

Film

 Dancing Girl (1951)
 Husband and Wife (1953)
 Samurai I: Musashi Miyamoto (1954)
 Floating Clouds (1955)
 The Lone Journey (1955)
 Samurai II: Duel at Ichijoji Temple (1955)
 Nagareru (1956)
 Samurai III: Duel at Ganryu Island (1956)
 Yagyu Secret Scrolls (1957)
 Doshaburi (1957)
 Spring Dreams (1960)
 Late Autumn (1960)
 Hunting Rifle (1961)
 Enraptured (1961)
 An Autumn Afternoon (1962)
 Akitsu Springs (1962) (also producer)
 The Scent of Incense (1964)
 A Story Written with Water (1965)
 Illusion of Blood (1965)
 Woman of the Lake (1966)
 The Affair (1967)
 Affair in the Snow (1968)
 Eros + Massacre (1969)
 Heroic Purgatory (1970)
 Coup d'État (1973) (also producer)
 Proof of the Man (1977) – Kyoko Yasugi
 The Fall of Ako Castle (1978) – Riku
 Conquest (1982)
 Tampopo (1985) – "Spaghetti Sensei", the etiquette coach
 A Taxing Woman (1987)
 The Geisha House (1999)
 Women in the Mirror (2002)
 My God, My God, Why Hast Thou Forsaken Me? (2005)

Television
 The Yagyu Conspiracy (1978) – Lady Kasuga
 Sanada Taiheiki (1985–86) – Yodo-dono

Bibliography
 Joyū Okada Mariko (2009)

Awards
 1958: 13th Mainichi Film Awards - Performance by an Actress in a Supporting Role for 
 1962: 17th Mainichi Film Awards - Performance by an Actress in a Leading Role for Love This Year and 
 1998: Golden Glory Award and Platinum Grand Prize, 8th Japan Movie Critics Awards

References

External links 
 

Japanese film actresses
1933 births
Living people
People from Tokyo
Actresses from Tokyo
20th-century Japanese actresses
21st-century Japanese actresses
Taiga drama lead actors